Barry Pemberton Laight  (12 July 1920 – 6 October 2012) was a British aerospace engineer, known for his design of the Spey-engined Buccaneer, one of the last all-British military aircraft, which left RAF service in March 1994.

Early life
He was the son of Donald Laight and Nora Pemberton, and was born in Liverpool. His father was a mechanic in the Royal Flying Corps.

In the 1930s he attended the Johnston School in the City of Durham, a grammar school. He later went to Birmingham Central Technical College (later Aston University), and the Merchant Venturer's Technical College in Bristol. In July 1937 he was awarded a scholarship from the Society of British Aerospace Constructors. He would later gain an MSc from the University of Bristol.

Career

Hawker Siddeley
He became Chief Engineer at the Hawker division of Hawker Siddeley (Advanced Projects Group) in 1963, and Director for Military Projects of HSA in 1968. At Hawker Siddeley he worked with Ralph Hooper on development of the Harrier for the RAF, and the development of the Hawk for the RAF too. He worked on the proposed Hawker Siddeley P.1154, which was cancelled in February 1965.

Personal life
He married Ruth Murton in 1951. They had a son and daughter. He became a member of Mensa in 1945. He was given the Silver Medal of the RAeS in 1963. He became a Fellow of the Royal Academy of Engineering in 1981.

He lived in Esher.

References

External links
 Future V/STOL Combat Aircraft in 1968
 Military Planes

1920 births
2012 deaths
Alumni of the University of Bristol
English aerospace engineers
Fellows of the Institution of Mechanical Engineers
Fellows of the Royal Academy of Engineering
Fellows of the Royal Aeronautical Society
Mensans
Officers of the Order of the British Empire
People from Durham, England
People from Esher
Royal Aeronautical Society Silver Medal winners
Engineers from Liverpool
Alumni of Aston University